Munlough may refer to the following places in the Republic of  Ireland:

Munlough North
Munlough South